Pagliacci Pizza is a Seattle-based restaurant chain. The first Pagliacci Pizza location opened on February 19, 1979, at 4529 University Ave NE in Seattle's University District. Over the years, this location underwent many face-lifts and remodeling changes until that location's closure in July 2018.
Since the original pizzeria opened, Pagliacci Pizza has grown to 25 locations across the greater Seattle and Bellevue area, most of which offer delivery, sit-down dining and pizza by the slice bars. An interior decor staple for the local chain is Italian-language movie posters. On November 1, 2012, Pagliacci Pizza opened Seattle's first stand-alone LEED-certified pizzeria in the Madison Park neighborhood.

Social presence 
In recent years, Pagliacci Pizza has made an effort to be more eco-friendly, using compostable boxes and packaging, and purchasing green-power offsets from Seattle City Light and Puget Sound Energy. Since 2011, Pagliacci Pizza's boxes have been made using materials from Forest Stewardship Council-certified local forests and post-consumer recycled fiber. The chain's Wallingford, Madison Park and Old Bellevue locations were built using sustainably-sourced materials.

In popular culture 
 Pagliacci Pizza menus and boxes were used as props in the movie Singles. This film was set in Seattle.
 Pagliacci Pizza box and menu were used as props in the movie 50/50. This movie was mostly filmed in areas outside Seattle, but set in Seattle.
 Author Kevin O'Brien mentions a Pagliacci Pizza delivery driver and pizza in his 2012 novel Killing Spree.

References

External links 

 

1979 establishments in Washington (state)
Pizza chains of the United States
Regional restaurant chains in the United States
Restaurants established in 1979
Restaurants in Seattle